João Paulo Azevedo Barbosa (born 12 February 1981), simply known as João Paulo, is a Brazilian footballer who plays for Nacional-AM as a goalkeeper.

Club career
Born in Limeira, São Paulo, João Paulo made his senior debuts with União São João in 2000. After subsequently playing for lower teams in the same state, he joined América-RN in 2007.

On 12 February 2008, after appearing with Rio Branco-ES, João Paulo signed for Metropolitano. He left the club in the following year, but after playing for Brasil de Pelotas, returned to Metrô in 2010.

João Paulo moved back to his native state on 2 October 2010, after agreeing to a deal with Mogi Mirim. On 15 April of the following year he joined Grêmio Barueri in Série B, making his debut in the category on 20 May 2011, starting in a 0–1 away loss against Goiás.

On 16 May 2012, after impressing with Grêmio Catanduvense in Campeonato Paulista (despite appearing in only three matches), João Paulo signed for Bragantino. After making no appearances for Braga, he moved to Icasa shortly after.

On 2 January 2013 João Paulo was announced at Joinville. On 13 May he joined Cuiabá, but returned to Metropolitano on 12 November.

On 27 June 2014, João Paulo agreed a contract with Blumenau, but on 2 July joined Atlético Sorocaba. On 3 November he moved to CSA, but rescinded his link on 19 February 2015.

Hours after rescinding with CSA, João Paulo signed a three-month deal with Série A club Chapecoense.

References

External links

1981 births
Living people
Footballers from São Paulo (state)
Brazilian footballers
Association football goalkeepers
Campeonato Brasileiro Série B players
União São João Esporte Clube players
Ituano FC players
Associação Atlética Internacional (Limeira) players
Oeste Futebol Clube players
América Futebol Clube (RN) players
Rio Branco Atlético Clube players
Clube Atlético Metropolitano players
Grêmio Esportivo Brasil players
Mogi Mirim Esporte Clube players
Grêmio Barueri Futebol players
Clube Atlético Bragantino players
Associação Desportiva Recreativa e Cultural Icasa players
Joinville Esporte Clube players
Cuiabá Esporte Clube players
Centro Sportivo Alagoano players
Associação Chapecoense de Futebol players
Brusque Futebol Clube players
Nacional Futebol Clube players